An eNotary is a Notary Public who notarizes documents electronically.  One of the methods employed by eNotaries is the use of a digital signature and digital notary seal to notarize digital documents and validate with a digital certificate. Also known as remote online notarization (RON), electronic notarization is a process whereby a notary affixes an electronic signature and notary seal using a secure Public key to an electronic document (such as a PDF or Word document). Once affixed to the electronic document, the document is rendered tamper evident such that unauthorized attempts to alter the document will be evident to relying parties. The e-notary will use cryptography and Public key infrastructure to create, manage, distribute, use, store, and revoke the digital certificate.  E-Notary will improve the overall security of the closing process with improved customer file tracking and knowledge-based identification authentication, helping to reduce the frequency of errors or fraud. The Electronic Notary also must keep an electronic register of each act performed.

In most cases, electronic notarizations does not mean that the notary can perform the electronic notarizations remotely as most states still require that the participants and the notary must all be physically present at the time of signing. There are also significant benefits to having the notarizations done electronically such as cost savings, superior security, authenticity, audit trails, and document integrity, which are things that are not available to paper based notarizations.

Jurisdiction

Currently, laws regarding eNotarizations vary by jurisdiction and are permitted in, at least, Arizona, California, Colorado, Delaware, Florida, Georgia, Indiana, Kansas, Kentucky,  Michigan, Minnesota New Mexico, North Carolina, Oregon, Pennsylvania, Texas, Utah, Wisconsin, and Virginia.

Remote eNotary

On July 1, 2012, Virginia became the first state to authorize a signer to be in a remote location and have a document notarized electronically by an e-notary using audio-visual conference technology (webcam), by passing the bills SB 827 and HB 2318.

In Virginia the case of an electronic notarization, "satisfactory evidence of identity" may be based on video and audio conference technology, in accordance with the standards for electronic video and audio communications set out in subdivisions B 1, B 2, and B 3, that permits the notary to communicate with and identify the principal at the time of the notarial act, provided that such identification is confirmed by (a) personal knowledge, (b) an antecedent in-person identity proofing process in accordance with the specifications of the Federal Bridge Certification Authority, or (c) a valid digital certificate accessed by biometric data or by use of an interoperable personal identity verification card that is designed, issued, and managed in accordance with the specifications published by the National Institute of Standards and Technology and in Federal Information Processing Standards.

Legality

The National Association of Secretaries of State (NASS) affirms the role of the Secretary of State or other state notary commissioning entity as the sole authority to establish standards enabling electronic notarizations that will protect signature credibility, avoid identity fraud and provide accountability to the public in order to promote secure electronic commerce.

References

Legal professions
Notary